The Khyber Pakhtunkhwa Police, formerly known as the Frontier Police, is the provincial law enforcement agency of Khyber Pakhtunkhwa, Pakistan.

History

British colonial era 
In 1849, the land corresponding to modern-day Khyber Pakhtunkhwa was annexed by the British Raj. Initially, the British maintained the policing system of the Mughals and Sikhs throughout most of the region; however, to establish a durable peace and security situation, the Punjab Frontier Force was raised. After the Indian Rebellion of 1857, there was no organized police force in British India, and a full-fledged policing system was established under the Commonwealth Police Act of 1861. The Act was extended to the Frontier Territory in 1889 and a number of armed personnel were placed at the disposal of the Deputy Commissioner/District Magistrate for police duties.

Police Act of 1861
After gaining full control of India the British rulers constituted a Police Commission on 17 August 1860. This Commission submitted its report within 22 days with a draft Police Act which was enacted in 1861 and the present Police force came into being. This Police Act was drafted on the lines of Irish Constabulary Act and was primarily meant to create a Police force to consolidate and maintain British rule in the region. It was absolutely different from the philosophy, duties and objectives of Police forces in Great Britain.

In 1901, the frontier territory was constituted as a province called the North-West Frontier Province (N-WFP) and placed under the Chief Commissioner control who used to agent to the Governor General of India. In this new province, two administrative systems were established: The British territory of the province was divided into five Settled Districts, i.e. Hazara, Peshawar, Kohat, Bannu and Dera Ismail Khan and the territories lying in the North and the West of the settled districts were divided into five Political Agencies, i.e. Khyber, Mohmand, Kurrum, North Waziristan & the South Waziristan Agencies. Each Political Agency was under a Political Agent. The Settled Districts were under the Inspector General of Police (IGP) of the N-WFP. Criminal Courts were established under Code of Criminal Procedure in 1889. There was Cantonment Police for the protections of garrisons as well.

For Political Agencies, different Levies were raised like Samana Rifles, Border Military Police, Chitral Scouts and Kurrum Militia. In addition to the Levies, the indigenous Maliki and Khasadari systems were also allowed to continue. Samana Rifles and Border Military Police were later merged in 1913 to form a new force – the Frontier Constabulary (FC) was constituted. In 1935, Police Training School was established in Hangu.

After a reasonable time of its introduction and operations on ground, the government of British India appointed a seven-member commission headed by Andrew Henderson Leith Fraser on 9 July 1902 in order to have a detailed review and to recommend possible improvements. The Commission recommended limited organizational and procedural modifications.

After Independence
The Police Rules were framed in 1934 which provide detailed instructions/procedures on all aspects of Police working. After the independence of Pakistan in 1947, the Police Act of 1861 was still in vogue, yet successive governments appointed 24 commissions and committees to suggest proposals to improve the police force in teething country.
The First Martyr/ Shaheed of KPK Police was Assistant Sub-Inspector Arbab Rafiullah Jan . He was a brave officer from Peshawar. He sacrificed his life while solving a public dispute between two parties in 1966 and he was awarded civil award Tamgha E Shujaat for the sacrifice. 
From 1901 to 1947, all Inspector General were British military of civil officers. After independence in 1947, Khan Gul Muhammad Khan became the first local IG Police in 1948. In 1955, Muhammad Anwar Ali became the IGP when NWFP became part of West Pakistan under One Unit System. MAK Chaudhary was posted as IGP NWFP in 1970 after the abolishment of the One Unit system. In 2010, NWFP was renamed as Khyber Pakhtunkhwa (KP) during the tenure of IGP Malik Naveed Khan.

Modern times
From 1947 to 2001, no major paradigm shift took place in the Khyber Pakhtunkhwa police organisation except when the police uniform was changed and black coloured shirt was introduced while the Khaki drill trousers of Pakistan Army was kept intact. This was done during President Muhammad Ayub Khan's time. This pattern of uniform is still in use.

The Government promulgated a new police order 2002 which brought many important changes in the police system and made it more responsive accountable and democratic.

Special Police Organizations
 
 Rapid Response Force - Known by its initials, the RRF is a special combat unit in the police department and has the ability for rapid deployment. It is equipped with latest technological weapons and gear, it is mastered in counter terrorism, hostage rescue and any other security matters. The uniform for such officers and commandos is all black with the elite police logo.

The Khyber-Pakhtunkhwa government will provide funding for police commandos to receive training along the pattern of the al Zarrar company of the Pakistan Army's Special Services Group. The govt has also set up a training school in Nowshehra for this very sole purpose.

 Reserve Frontier Police, a 10,000 man force operating in the Khyber Pakhtunkhwa province (formerly "North West Frontier Province").
 Elite force - a specialized unite of 6,000 high risk security operations and counter terrorism.
 Khyber Pakhtunkhwa Police Special Combat Unit (SCU) - a large province wide tactical police unit

Beginning in the spring of 2019 the Levies and Khasadar became the armed reserve of the Khyber Pakhtunkhwa Police.

Agency executives of Khyber Pakhtunkhwa Police

Inspector Generals of Police
The current Inspector General of Khyber Pakhtunkhwa Police is: mozam jan ansari

Below is a list of former inspector generals that served the Khyber Pakhtunkhwa Police.
 Arthur Finch Perrott (CIE, IP)
 4 April 1938 – 3 April 1939
 2 August 1940 – 1 September 1940
 2 December 1940 – 30 August 1944
 3 October 1944 – 1 July 1945
 29 August 1945 – 3 October 1945
 Sir Oliver Gilbert Grace (CIE, OBE)
 10 April 1947 – 23 April 1948
 1 November 1948 – 9 August 1951
 Sardar Abdur Rashid (PSP)
 10 August 1951 – 31 July 1952
 1 October 1952 – 23 April 1953
 Ayub Baksh Awan (PSP)
 1 August 1952 – 9 November 1952
 24 April 1953 – 17 August 1955
 Mahmood Ali Khan Chaudhry (PSP)
 1 July 1970 – 10 May 1971
 Muhammad Muzaffar Khan Bangash (TQA, PPM, PSP)
 14 May 1971 – 7 Nov 1972
 Saifullah Khan (PSP)
 7 November 1972 – 12 February 1974
 Mian Bashir Ahmed (PSP)
 18 February 1972 – 19 February 1975
 M Y Orakzai (PSP)
 19 February 1975 – 14 July 1980
 Dil Jan Khan Marwat (PSP)
 1 December 1983 – 2 November 1985
 Muhammad Abbas Khan (PSP)
 3 November 1985 – 1 June 1988
 29 January 1989 – 5 September 1990
 Syed Saddat Ali Shah (PSP) 
 12 June 1988 – 29 January 1989
 Syed Masud Shah (PSP)
 5 September 1990 – 28 July 1993
 26 February 1994 – 10 November 1996
 Javaid Qayum Khan (PSP)
 28 July 1993 – 26 February 1994
 Muhammad Aziz Khan (PSP)
 10 November 1996 – 10 March 1997
 Syed Kamal Shah (SST, PSP)
 10 March 1997 – 26 October 1999
 Muhammad Saeed Khan (PSP)
 26 October 1999 – 7 June 2003
 Muhammad Raffat Pasha (PSP)
 17 June 2003 – 8 January 2007
 Muhammad Sharif Virk (PSP)
 8 January 2007 – 11 March 2008
 Malik Naveed Khan (PSP)
 12 March 2008 – 30 August 2010
 Fiaz Ahmad Khan Toru (PSP)
 31 August 2010 – 24 October 2011
 Muhammad Akbar Khan Hoti (PSP)
 25 October 2011 – 16 April 2013
 Lt.Cdr (R) Ihsan Ghani (PSP)
 May 2013 - September 2013
 Nasir Durrani
 25 September 2013 – 16 March 2017
 Syed Akhtar Ali Shah (Acting)
 17 March 2017 – 4 APRIL 2017
 Salahuddin Khan Mehsud
 31 March 2017 – 13 June 2018
 Mohammad Tahir
 14 June 2018- 10 September 2018
Salahuddin Khan Mehsud
 11 September 2018 to 9 February 2019
 Muhammad Naeem Khan
 11 February 2019  to  2 January 2020
Sanaullah Abbasi 
from 2 January 2020 to 11 June 2021
Moazzam Jah Ansari
from 11 June 2021 to 10 February 2023
Akhtar Hayat
from 10 February 2023 to Present

Additional IGs
Various Additional Inspector Generals of Police are assisting the IGP to look after distinct affairs in the Khyber Pakhtunkhwa province. Below is a list of current Additional IGPs:

 Addl:IGP Headquarters, Khyber Pakhtunkhwa:   Ishtiaq Ahmad Khan Marwat
 Addl:IGP Elite Police Force, Khyber Pakhtunkhwa: Muhammad Saeed Wazir
 Addl:IGP Investigations, Khyber Pakhtunkhwa:  Capt Retd Feroze Shah
 Addl:IGP IAB, Khyber Pakhtunkhwa:  Salman Chaudhary
 Addl:IGP Special Branch, Khyber Pakhtunkhwa: Akhtar Hayat Khan
 Addl:IGP CTD, Khyber Pakhtunkhwa: Capt. (R) Tahir Ayub

Designations
Designations of Khyber Pakhtunkhwa Police are as follow:

Posts
SHO, SDPO, DPO, CPO, RPO and PPO are posts, not ranks. So you may see a lower rank acting as a higher post for some time.

See also
Law enforcement in Pakistan
Balochistan Police
Punjab Police
Sindh Police

References

External links
 Official website

 
Provincial law enforcement agencies of Pakistan